Botanic is one of the ten district electoral areas (DEA) in Belfast, Northern Ireland. The district elects five members to Belfast City Council and contains the wards of Blackstaff; Central; Ormeau; Stranmillis and Windsor. Botanic, along with neighbouring Balmoral, forms the greater part of the Belfast South constituencies for the Northern Ireland Assembly and UK Parliament. It covers large parts of the centre and southern parts of the city.

It was created for the 2014 local elections, largely replacing the Laganbank District Electoral Area, which had existed since 1985. The DEA is named after Belfast's Botanic Gardens.

Education
Botanic is the location for several of the city's most important education establishments, including Queen's University Belfast, Stranmillis University College and Union Theological College, as well as the College Square campus of Belfast Metropolitan College. The location of these institutions in close proximity saw the area's popularity among students increase, particularly in the Holyland area.

The area is also home to some of the most prominent schools, including Methodist College Belfast and the Royal Belfast Academical Institution.

Culture

The portion of Botanic to the west of the River Lagan, based around Queen's University, forms the Queen's Quarter, and contains many of the key cultural facilities within the city. The Quarter is home to the Belfast Festival at Queen's, the largest annual arts festival in Ireland, as well as amenities such as the Botanic Gardens, the Brian Friel Theatre, the Crescent Arts Centre, the Elmwood Hall, the Lyric Theatre, the Naughton Gallery at Queen's, the Queen's Film Theatre and the Ulster Museum.

As well as the Queen's Quarter, there are a number of important cultural attractions within the wider DEA section of the city centre, including the Grand Opera House, the Linen Hall Library, the Ormeau Baths Gallery, the Ulster Hall, the Ulster Orchestra and the Waterfront Hall. This area is also sometimes referred to as the Golden Mile because of the large number of bars, clubs and restaurants located there.

Other amenities

Other noteworthy amenities in the Botanic district electoral area include:

 Belfast Central, Botanic, Great Victoria Street and City Hospital railway stations
 Belfast City Hall
 Belfast City Hospital
 Broadcasting House (BBC Northern Ireland)
 Crown Liquor Saloon
 Europa Hotel
 Havelock House (UTV)
 Queen's University Belfast Students' Union
 Royal Courts of Justice
 St George's Market
 St Malachy's Church
 Victoria Square Shopping Centre
 Windsor House

Councillors

2019 Results
2014: 1 x DUP, 1 x Alliance, 1 x Sinn Féin, 1 x SDLP, 1 x UUP
2019: 1 x DUP, 1 x Alliance, 1 x Sinn Féin, 1 x SDLP, 1 x Green

2014-2019 Change: Green gain from UUP

2014 Results 
2014: 1 x DUP, 1 x Alliance, 1 x Sinn Féin, 1 x SDLP, 1 x UUP

References

Electoral wards of Belfast
2014 establishments in Northern Ireland